Miljan Vukadinović (born 27 December 1992) is a Serbian professional footballer who plays as a winger for Tobol.

Career
After starting out at Hajduk Beograd, Vukadinović moved abroad to the Czech Republic and played for MAS Táborsko, Mladá Boleslav, and Slavia Prague. He later returned to Serbia and joined Serbian SuperLiga side Zemun in January 2018.

In July 2019 Vukadinović joined SuperLiga club from Kruševac, Napredak.

On 14 January 2020, after a good half-season in Napredak, Vukadinović signed a 2.5 year contract with another SuperLiga club, Vojvodina.

On 5 July 2022, Vukadinović signed for Kazakh club Tobol.

Personal life
Vukadinović is the younger brother of fellow footballer Vukadin Vukadinović.

Honours
Mladá Boleslav
Czech Cup: 2015–16

Vojvodina
Serbian Cup: 2019–20

References

External links
 
 

Association football midfielders
Czech First League players
Czech National Football League players
Expatriate footballers in the Czech Republic
FC Silon Táborsko players
FK Hajduk Beograd players
FK Mladá Boleslav players
FK Napredak Kruševac players
FK Zemun players
FK Vojvodina players
Footballers from Belgrade
Serbian expatriate footballers
Serbian expatriate sportspeople in the Czech Republic
Serbian First League players
Serbian footballers
Serbian SuperLiga players
SK Slavia Prague players
1992 births
Living people
Serbia international footballers